Gen. Leandro Fullón y Locsín (March 13, 1874 – October 16, 1904) was a Philippine general and government administrator who fought against both the Spaniards during the Philippine Revolution and the United States invasion force during the Philippine-American War.

A member of the Katipunan, Fullón helped organize the first revolutionary government in the Philippines. He led the expeditionary forces to Panay and later established a Revolutionary Provincial Government in Antique. Fullón later became the first Filipino Governor of the Province of Antique from 1901 to 1904.

Early life 
Leandro Fullón was born on March 13, 1874, to Justo Guerrero Fullon and Fausta Gerona Locsin in Hamtic, Antique. He studied at Ateneo Municipal de Manila before transferring to Colegio de San Juan de Letran in Manila in 1896.

Personal life
At age 22, Fullon married Petra Francisco, daughter of Evaristo Francisco and Margarita Dairo, a prominent family from Binondo, Manila.

War with Spain 

In 1897, Fullón joined the Katipunan to fight the Spanish in the Philippine Revolution. 

On September 6, 1898, Fullón, now a general in the Philippine forces, was assigned by General Emilio Aguinaldo and returned to Antique with 140 officers and 350 men under his command. After arriving in Antique on September 21, many local volunteers joined his forces.

Fullón established a revolutionary government in Pandan and Culasi . On Nov. 22, 1898, Fullón's forces captured San Jose de Buenavista.  He formed a Revolutionary Provincial Government with Ángel Salazar (Governor), Santos Capadocia (Vice Governor), Anacleto Villavert Jiménez and José Gontanilla (Council of Justice), Anselmo Alicante (Council of Internal Revenue) and Vicente Gella (Representative to Malolos Congress).

Fullón's forces fought the Spanish in San Miguel, Pavia and outside Jaro in Iloilo City;. The new revolutionary government in Visayas later appointed Fullón as Politico-Military Governor of Antique.

War with the United States 
On December 10, 1898, Spain ceded the Philippines to the United States to end the Spanish-American War.  When U.S. forces entered Iloilo on February 11, 1899,  Fullón joined in the resistance.  In early 1900, he returned to Antique to continue fighting.  On March 22, 1901, Fullón and the other resistance fighter were forced to surrender.

On April 15, 1901, the American authorities appointed Fullón Provincial Governor of Antique.  He held that position until his death in Oct. 16, 1904, aged 30.

References 

1874 births
Karay-a people
Filipino generals
People of the Philippine Revolution
People of the Philippine–American War
1904 deaths
Colegio de San Juan de Letran alumni
Members of the Philippine Independent Church